The Grace Joint School District is a school district in Grace, Idaho.

Schools 
Grace High School
Grace Junior High School
Grace Elementary School
Thatcher Elementary School

District Board 
Bart O. Christensen (Zone 5), Board Chair 
Randy Lloyd (Zone 3), Board Vice-Chair 
Tod Jensen (Zone 1)  
Kent Clegg (Zone 2) 
David Kendall (Zone 4) 
Jamie Holyoak, Superintendent 
Billie Ann Straatman, District Clerk 

School districts in Idaho
Education in Caribou County, Idaho
School districts established in 1953
1953 establishments in Idaho